4 Kings ( or 4 Kings ar chee wa yuk 90, lit: 4 Kings 90's vocational) is a 2021 Thai drama-crime film written and directed by Phuttipong Nakthong.

The film is about vocational students battle between different schools in the '90s.

Plot 
The film set in 1995 by told through the memories of Billy, a former vocational student who turned to be a single dad with Am his teenage daughter. Though this father-daughter relationship is not very healthy, when Am gets injured from a vocational school gangs fight, Billy reminisces his own and his friends' pasts. In the '90s, there were many vocational schools that were notorious for being rowdy students, in those days the most famous were four schools which were Intaraarcheewasueksa, Changkolburanapol, Technologyprachachol and Kanokarcheewa. They were collectively nicknamed "4 Kings".

Billy got depressed when his mother remarried and his stepfather just hated him. His only getaway is his close friends, so he had to do everything to keep and protect his comradeship with his schoolmates. Billy encountered all sorts of conflicts and lost his best friend. It is such a big life lesson that he has to pay back until these days.

Cast 
 Itkron Pungkiatrussamee (Jaii TaitosmitH) as Billy
 Poom Rungsrithananon as Lupin
 Arak Amornsupasiri (Pae Slur) as Da
 Nat Kitcharit as Oh
 Sirat Intarachote as Ek
 Akarin Akaranitimaytharatt as Mot
 Ukrit Willibrord Dongabriel (ฺBig D Gerrard) as Yat
 Sompol Rungpanich (Lham Somphol) as Bang
 Naerunchara Lertprasert as Ou
 Sukanya Migael as Da's mother
 Jirawat Wachirasarunpat as Ou's father
 Paramej Noiam as Billy's stepfather
 Priya Sangkhachinda as Am, Inthira
 Ratchanee Boontatharokul as Billy's mother
 Pimchamai Pattarasinsiri as Ou's mother
 Warawut Brown as Rang
 Chanatip Pisutseerewong as X

Production & reception 
The film based on actual events in Thai society about the issue of quarrels among teenage vocational students which injures unrelated persons as well. They often fought on the streets, on buses, or at bus stops. Film director and writer Phuttipong Nakthong had been through these terrible times and therefore used his own experience to convey it into a screenplay. It took up to 7 years for production to be released. It is his debut film from newlyn motion picture production company Neramitnang Film.

4 Kings develops itself from a short film in same title released on social media in mid-2015 about a battle between vocational students until it became very well known.

When it was released, it quickly gained popularity and became a phenomenon. It was No. 1 at the box office on opening weekend, with a total income of ฿50 million after only 4 days of showing, beating Thai-South Korean found footage mockumentary horror film The Medium from the top spot. Separately, Thai Civilized Party leader Mongkolkit Suksintharanon on December 14 invited vocational students to join him at Esplanade Cineplex Ngamwongwan-Khae Rai to watch the film.

At each screening in theatres in various locations, vocational students often gather to watch the film. And they often fight after it ends. It has been observed whether this is a film imitation behavior.

The film has been in theatres for 9 weeks in a row. Total revenue of ฿170 million was considered the highest grossing Thai film in the year.

It was selected to screen at the 17th Japan Asian Film Festival or Osaka Asian Film Festival 2022 as a special program New Action! Southeast Asia between March 10–20, 2022, as well as being nominated for 2 awards.

It was shown again as an outdoor cinema in the evening of July 14, 2022 at the Vachirabenjatas Park (Rot Fai Park) as part of Open-Air Movie Festival by Bangkok Metropolitan Administration (BMA).

Original soundtrack 
 "Nak Leng Kao" (นักเลงเก่า; "Former Gangster"), ending theme by TaitosmitH feat D Gerrard
 "Mung Kub Ku" (มึงกับกู; "You & I") by Itkron Pungkiatrussamee
 "Kid Pai Aeng" (คิดไปเอง; "All In Your Mind") by SMF
 "Palang Rak" (พลังรัก; "Love Power") by SMF
 "Wad Rawaeng" (หวาดระแวง; "Paranoid") by SMF
 "Khon" ("ก่อน"; "Before") by Modern Dog
 "Sabai Dee" (สบายดี; "Fine") by Nakarin Kingsak

Accolades

Sequels
9:29 a.m. Friday, October 14, 2022, Neramitnang Film executives and the production team have joined together to sacrifice for the filming of 4 Kings Part 2 at Wat Ratchasittharam temple, along with the debut of performers at the same time. There are both old and new performers participated.

4 Kings Part 2 scheduled to be released in 2023. It is believed the story seems to be a conflict between Kanokarcheewa and Changkolburanapol as shown in a mid-credits scene shows three Kanok students, led by Bang walk to face three Buranapol students, led by Ek. Bang shoots a gun to threaten the sky and finally saying  "See you on the next album, friends".

Notes

References

External links 
 
 

2021 directorial debut films
Films set in 1995
Films set in Bangkok
2021 crime drama films
Thai crime drama films
Crime films based on actual events
Drama films based on actual events